Scissurella petermannensis is a species of minute sea snail, a marine gastropod mollusk in the family Scissurellidae.

Description
The size of the shell varies between 1.2 mm and 1.8 mm.

Distribution
This species occurs in Antarctic waters, off the Falkland Islands, Tierra del Fuego, South Georgia, South Shetland Islands and the South Orkneys at depths to 31 m.

References

 Melvill, J. C. and R. Standen. 1912. The marine Mollusca of the Scottish National Antarctic Expedition. Part II. Being a supplementary catalogue. Transactions of the Royal Society of Edinburgh 48: 333–366, 1 pl
 Engl W. (2012) Shells of Antarctica. Hackenheim: Conchbooks. 402 pp
 Zelaya D.G. & Geiger D.L. (2007). Species of Scissurellidae and Anatomidae from Sub-Antarctic and Antarctic waters (Gastropopda: Vetigastropoda). Malacologia 49(2), pp. 393–443
Geiger D.L. (2012) Monograph of the little slit shells. Volume 1. Introduction, Scissurellidae. pp. 1-728. Volume 2. Anatomidae, Larocheidae, Depressizonidae, Sutilizonidae, Temnocinclidae. pp. 729–1291. Santa Barbara Museum of Natural History Monographs Number 7.

External links

Scissurellidae
Gastropods described in 1910